Vrijheid was a Dutch 74-gun third rate ship of the line of the navy of the Dutch Republic, the Batavian Republic, and the Royal Navy. 
The order to construct the ship was given by the Admiralty of Amsterdam. The ship was commissioned in 1782.

In 1783, a squadron consisting of the ships Vrijheid, Noordholland, Hercules, Drenthe, Prins Willem and Harlingen was dispatched to the Mediterranean to deal with differences that had arisen with Venice. On 2 February 1784, the squadron docked at the coast near the island of Menorca. In the night between 3 and 4 February a storm blew up which lasted for 48 hours. Vrijheid was almost smashed on the rocks and only just managed to stay afloat, while Drenthe keeled over and sank.

In 1795, the ship was commissioned in the Batavian Navy.

On 11 October 1797 Vrijheid took part in the Battle of Camperdown as the flagship of Admiral Jan Willem de Winter. At a certain point, Vrijheid was engaged by four British ships, and after heavy fighting the ship surrendered.

The ship was renamed HMS Vryheid, and from 1798 she served as a prison ship. In 1802 she became a powder hulk until she was sold in 1811.

References

Ships of the line of the Dutch Republic
Ships of the line of the Batavian Republic
Ships of the line of the Royal Navy
Ships built in Amsterdam
1782 ships
Maritime incidents in 1797